Francesco Ferruccio was a  armored cruiser built for the Royal Italian Navy (Regia Marina) in the first decade of the 20th century. The ship made several deployments to the Eastern Mediterranean and the Levant during her career. At the beginning of the Italo-Turkish War of 1911–12 she bombarded Tripoli and then Beirut in early 1912 before being transferred to Libya. During World War I, Francesco Ferruccios activities were limited by the threat of Austro-Hungarian submarines and she became a training ship in 1919. The ship was struck from the naval register in 1930 and subsequently scrapped.

Design and description
She displaced  at normal load. The ship was powered by two vertical triple-expansion steam engines, each driving one shaft, using steam from 24 coal-fired Belleville boilers. Her complement ordinarily consisted of 555 officers and enlisted men and 578 when acting as a flagship.

Her main armament consisted of one  gun in a turret forward of the superstructure and two  guns in a twin turret aft. Ten of the  guns that comprised her secondary armament were arranged in casemates amidships; the remaining four 152-millimeter guns were mounted on the upper deck. Francesco Ferruccio also had ten  and six  guns to defend herself against torpedo boats. She was fitted with four single  torpedo tubes.

The ship's waterline armor belt had a maximum thickness of  amidships and tapered to  towards the ends of the ship. The conning tower, casemates, and gun turrets were also protected by 150-millimeter armor.

Construction and service
Francesco Ferruccio, named after the condottiere Francesco Ferruccio, was laid down at the Naval Dockyard in Venice on 19 August 1899 and launched on 23 April 1902, when she was named by the Duchess of Genoa. She was completed on 1 September 1905. During the 1905 fleet maneuvers, she was assigned to the "hostile" force blockading La Maddalena, Sardinia. Francesco Ferruccio made a cruise to the Levant in July 1909 and was deployed to Crete from 26 June 1910 to January 1911, returning to Taranto on 25 January.

When the Italo-Turkish War began on 29 September 1911, Francesco Ferruccio assigned to the 4th Division of the 2nd Squadron of the Mediterranean Fleet, together with her sisters Giuseppe Garibaldi and Varese. Francesco Ferruccio and Giuseppe Garibaldi bombarded Tripoli on 3–4 October while Varese stood offshore to watch for any Ottoman ships. The desultory bombardment killed 12 Ottoman soldiers and severely wounded 23 more in addition to 7 dead civilians. On 13 October, the three sisters sailed to Augusta, Sicily to recoal. Francesco Ferruccio and Giuseppe Garibaldi bombarded Beirut on 24 February 1912, sinking the elderly  and forced the torpedo boat  to scuttle itself. Varese is sometimes credited with participating also in the bombardment. The bombardment killed over 140 civilians and wounded more than 200 more. The ship was then transferred to Libya and remained there for the rest of the war. During the First Balkan War, she was deployed to Albania from 18 February to 5 June 1913 and then made another deployment there from 4 January to 7 February 1914.

When Italy declared war on the Central Powers in May 1915, she was assigned to the 5th Cruiser Division, based at Brindisi. On 5 June the division bombarded rail lines near Ragusa and departed Brindisi on the evening of 17 July to do the same near Ragusa Vecchia the following morning. Shortly after beginning the bombardment at 04:00, Giuseppe Garibaldi was torpedoed by the Austro-Hungarian submarine . Struck by a single torpedo, the cruiser sank within minutes, although only 53 crewmen were killed. The division immediately retreated to avoid further attacks, leaving three destroyers behind to rescue survivors. The loss of Giuseppe Garibaldi and the sinking of the armored cruiser  by another submarine on 7 July severely restricted the activities of the other ships based in the Adriatic Sea. Francesco Ferruccio was briefly stationed in the Levant from 19 November to 22 December before returning to Brindisi where she escorted convoys to Albania and patrolled the Albanian coast for the rest of the war.

Francesco Ferruccio became a cadet training ship in 1919 and finally was converted for the role in 1924. On 30 July 1922, she collided with the Spanish cargo ship  in the Bay of Biscay; Ayala Mendi sank with the loss of one member of her 33-man crew.

Francesco Ferruccio was stricken on 1 April 1930 and scrapped.

Notes

Footnotes

Bibliography

Further reading

External links
 Francesco Ferruccio Marina Militare website

Giuseppe Garibaldi-class cruisers of the Regia Marina
Ships built in Venice
1902 ships
World War I cruisers of Italy
Maritime incidents in 1922
Ships built by Venetian Arsenal